Mercenaria campechiensis is a species of bivalve belonging to the family Veneridae.

The species is found in North America.

References

Veneridae